Ginger Snaps 2: Unleashed (also known as Ginger Snaps II or Ginger Snaps: Unleashed) is a 2004 Canadian horror film, written by Megan Martin and directed by Brett Sullivan. It is the second installment in the Ginger Snaps series and sequel to Ginger Snaps (2000), directed by executive producer John Fawcett and written in collaboration with Karen Walton. A prequel, Ginger Snaps Back: The Beginning, was filmed back-to-back with Ginger Snaps 2: Unleashed and was also released in 2004.

Plot
Brigitte Fitzgerald uses monkshood extract to fight the effects of lycanthropy that transformed her sister Ginger into a werewolf. Brigitte shaves off excess hair, cuts her arm with a scalpel, and logs the data about her healing ability. Ginger appears as an apparition and warns her that monkshood only slows her transformation progression and is not a cure. After Brigitte injects a second dose of monkshood, she senses the presence of a male werewolf that has been stalking her. She quickly packs and opens the door, only to find Jeremy, a flirtatious librarian who has brought to her several books she attempted to check out earlier. The second injection causes toxic shock, and Jeremy attempts to bring her to the hospital; however, the male werewolf mauls him to death. Brigitte stumbles down the street and collapses in the snow.

Brigitte wakes in a rehab clinic, from which she unsuccessfully attempts to escape. She pleads to be released, but Alice, the clinic's director, refuses; however, Brigitte palms a piece of glass to measure her healing rate. Tyler, a worker at the clinic, offers to trade monkshood for sexual favors, which she declines. As her healing rate accelerates, so does her rate of transformation. Ginger continues to appear, taunting Brigitte as she experiences growing cravings for sex and murder, which Ginger also had. During a group therapy session, Brigitte fantasizes about being instructed to lie on the floor and masturbate; a vision of Ginger jolts her back to reality, and her palm is revealed to be covered in hair. Later, depressed, she holds the shard of glass to her throat in front of a mirror, but she does not kill herself.

While at the clinic, a girl named Ghost – the granddaughter of Barbara, a severe burn victim at the hospital – follows the clinical staff, who discuss Brigitte's injections of monkshood, and realizes Brigitte's secret. Ghost slips Brigitte a werewolf comic book and begins to question her about lycanthropy. When Ghost notices that Brigitte's ears have become pointed, Brigitte cuts off the tips. Ghost, now convinced of Brigitte's lycanthropy, attempts to slip Brigitte monkshood, but Tyler prevents it. In despair at her rate of transformation, Brigitte allows Tyler to inject her. After the male werewolf tracks Brigitte to the clinic, she and Ghost plan their escape. They crawl through air vents to reach the basement, where they encounter Beth-Ann, an addict who traded sex for drugs. The male werewolf kills and drags away Beth-Ann, and Brigitte is wounded after she fights the werewolf, but her wounds heal almost instantly.

Ghost drives them to Barbara's house and explains that Barbara fell asleep with her bedtime cigarette. The next morning, Brigitte eats a hunted deer while it is still alive. Brigitte realizes that the effects of lycanthropy are progressing too fast, and with no other choice, the duo arrange a meeting at a gas station with Tyler to procure more monkshood. When Brigitte wanders in the gas station, she discovers the attendant has been slain. Brigitte quickly returns to the car to find Tyler arriving, and, when they return to Barbara's house, Tyler administers monkshood to Brigitte, which her body violently rejects. Worried, Tyler calls Alice. Jealous of the attention that Tyler is getting, Ghost tricks Brigitte into thinking that Tyler abused her, causing Brigitte to lock Tyler outside, where the werewolf kills him. Alice arrives, and Ghost attacks her with Barbara's hunting rifle. Alice confronts Ghost about her delusions, and Brigitte, realizing that Barbara is not a smoker, aggressively pins Ghost against the wall and argues with her; she realizes that Tyler did not abuse Ghost, and Ghost burnt Barbara.

Alice attempts to take Ghost with her, but retreats to the attic once the werewolf breaks in through a window. Brigitte, whose transformation is almost complete, lures the werewolf into a room. Brigitte stabs him while Ghost distracts the werewolf. The werewolf bites Brigitte, and, as they struggle, they both fall into the basement, where the werewolf is impaled on a booby-trapped mattress. Ghost kills Alice with a hammer, and a weakened Brigitte begs Ghost to kill her before the transformation completes. Instead, Ghost locks her in the basement and illustrates a comic book that depicts herself as a powerful warrior with a werewolf pet. Ghost narrates that Brigitte is getting stronger and is waiting to be unleashed on her enemies. A doorbell is heard, and Ghost prepares to welcome Barbara home.

Cast
 Emily Perkins as Brigitte Fitzgerald
 Tatiana Maslany as Ghost
 Eric Johnson as Tyler
 Janet Kidder as Alice Severson
 Brendan Fletcher as Jeremy
 Katharine Isabelle as Ginger Fitzgerald
 Susan Adam as Barbara
 Chris Fassbender as Luke
 Pascale Hutton as Beth-Ann
 Michelle Beaudoin as Winnie
 David McNally as Marcus
 Shaun Johnston as Jack
 Patricia Idlette as Dr. Brookner

Release
Ginger Snaps 2: Unleashed was released in Canadian theaters on 30 January 2004, and Lionsgate released it on home video in the United States on 13 April.

Reception
Rotten Tomatoes, a review aggregator, reports that 88% of 16 surveyed critics gave the film a positive review; the average rating was 6.5/10. Dennis Harvey of Variety wrote that it "keeps most cliches at bay, and actually is less formulaic, even if storytelling and [performances] remain uneven".  Liam Lacey of The Globe and Mail wrote: "Though less original and satiric than the original, and more decorated with gore and prank scares, the movie maintains the previous film's mordant tone".  Brad Miska of Bloody Disgusting rated it 2.5/5 stars and called it "a major letdown" that "is an enjoyable film, yet nothing to get all psyched about".

Ernest Mathijs, in his book John Fawcett's Ginger Snaps, wrote that the sequel is "more radical and nihilist". He identifies the major themes as self-harm, drug addiction, and deconstruction of the themes explored in the first film.

Accolades

References

External links
 
 
 
 Ginger Snaps 2 on Ginger-Snaps.com

2004 films
2004 horror films
2004 drama films
2000s teen horror films
Canadian drama films
Canadian teen films
Canadian sequel films
English-language Canadian films
Films shot in Edmonton
Canadian werewolf films
Films set in hospitals
Ginger Snaps films
Lionsgate films
2004 directorial debut films
2000s English-language films
2000s Canadian films
Copperheart Entertainment films